Tour EP may refer to:

Tour EP (Band of Horses EP), 2005
Tour EP (Iron & Wine EP), 2002
Tour EP (Limbeck EP), 2006
Tour EP 1, by Nomeansno, 2010
Tour EP 2, by Nomeansno, 2010
Tour EP '04, by Pedro the Lion
Tour EP (Strapping Young Lad EP), 2003
Tour EP (Sucioperro EP)
Tour EP (Unwed Sailor EP), 2011